George Edwin Starbuck (June 15, 1931 in Columbus, Ohio – August 15, 1996 in Tuscaloosa, Alabama) was an American poet of the neo-formalist school.

Life
Starbuck studied at Chadwick School, the California Institute of Technology, the University of California, Berkeley, the  American Academy in Rome, the University of Chicago, and Harvard University. He also studied under Robert Lowell in the Boston University workshop with Sylvia Plath and Anne Sexton. He taught at the Iowa Writers Workshop, Boston University, and the State University of New York, Buffalo. He was fired by SUNY-Buffalo for not taking a loyalty oath, but was vindicated by the Supreme Court. His students included Maxine Kumin, Peter Davison, Emily Hiestand, Mary Baine Campbell, Craig Lucas, James Hercules Sutton, and Askold Melnyczuk.

Starbuck had five children: Margaret, Stephen, John, Anthony, and Joshua.  His papers are held at the University of Alabama library.

Starbuck's work is marked by clever rhymes, witty asides, and the fusing of Romantic themes with cynicism about modern life. For example, his book Bone Thoughts was published with half its pages blank, and he called his style of formalism "SLABS" (Standard Length And Breadth Sonnets). He was not widely appreciated in the mainstream culture during his lifetime, but two new collections of his poems have been published in the last few years, Poems Selected from Five Decades and Visible Ink, helping win him a wider audience.

Starbuck's best-known poems include "Tuolumne," "On an Urban Battlefield," and "Sonnet With a Different Letter At the End of Every Line."

Awards
 1993 Aiken Taylor Award for Modern American Poetry
 1982 Lenore Marshall Poetry Prize, for The Argot Merchant Disaster: Poems New and Selected
 1960 Yale Series of Younger Poets Competition

Partial bibliography
The Works: Poems Selected from Five Decades,  University of Alabama Press, 2003
Translations from the English, University of Alabama (Tuscaloosa), 2003
Visible Ink, University of Alabama Press,  2002 
Space Saver Sonnets, Bits Press, 1986
Richard the Third in a Fourth of a Second, Bits Press,  1986
The Argot Merchant Disaster: Poems New and Selected, Little, Brown & Co. 1982
Talkin' B.A. Blues, Pym-Randall Press, 1980
Desperate Measures, D. R. Godine, August 1978
Elegy in a Country Churchyard, Pym-Randall Press,  September 1975
White Paper, Little, Brown & Co. 1966
Bone Thoughts, Yale University Press, 1960

Anthologies

References

External links

1931 births
1996 deaths
20th-century American poets
Boston University faculty
California Institute of Technology alumni
University of California, Berkeley alumni
University of Chicago alumni
Harvard University alumni
Iowa Writers' Workshop faculty
University at Buffalo faculty
Writers from Columbus, Ohio
Poets from Ohio
Yale Younger Poets winners